Cem Efe (born 9 June 1978) is a German-Turkish football manager and former player.

Playing career 
Efe was born in West Berlin. He scored three goals in 14 games during the 2001–02 season for SV Babelsberg 03 in the 2. Bundesliga.

Coaching career 
After his retirement, Efe worked in the 2008–09 season as assistant coach of the Berlin-Liga team Hertha Zehlendorf. In the 2009–10 season, he was named as head coach of the U-19 team and gained promotion to the Under 19 Bundesliga.

References

External links 
 

1978 births
Living people
German people of Turkish descent
German footballers
Turkish footballers
Footballers from Berlin
Association football forwards
Hertha BSC II players
SV Meppen players
VfL Osnabrück players
SV Babelsberg 03 players
MKE Ankaragücü footballers
FC Oberlausitz Neugersdorf players
Berliner AK 07 players
SV Yeşilyurt players
Torgelower FC Greif players
Türkiyemspor Berlin players
2. Bundesliga players
German football managers
Turkish football managers
SV Babelsberg 03 managers